The International Journal of Cross Cultural Management is a triannual peer-reviewed academic journal that covers the field of cross-cultural management. The editor-in-chief is Terence Jackson (Middlesex University). The journal was established in 2001 and is published by SAGE Publications.

Abstracting and indexing 
The journal is abstracted and indexed in:
 Academics Premier
 British Education Index
 Current Contents/Social and Behavioral Sciences
 Current Index to Journals in Education
 Educational Research Abstracts Online
 Management & Marketing Abstracts Database
 Social Sciences Citation Index
 Scopus

External links 
 

SAGE Publishing academic journals
English-language journals
Business and management journals
Triannual journals
Publications established in 2001
Cultural journals